The Embassy of Japan in London is the diplomatic mission of Japan in the United Kingdom. The embassy occupies a large Victorian building on Piccadilly opposite Green Park, which is Grade II listed. It was once the former Junior Constitutional Club, which was the first building in London to have its exterior entirely clad in marble.

Role

The Japanese embassy performs a sustaining role in Japan–United Kingdom relations, dealing with political, economic and cultural interaction between the two nations, and also offers visa services to British and other nationals in UK. It also provides consular services for the more than 66,000 Japanese citizens currently living in UK. Scotland and northwest England are under the jurisdiction of the Consulate-General of Japan in  Edinburgh.

The embassy also houses the Public Relations and Cultural Centre Library which was established for the purpose of promoting Japan in the UK. The library houses approximately 3,800 books on Japanese-British history and Japanese culture; it also stocks Japanese newspapers, DVDs and music. Books can be borrowed from the library.

See also

British Embassy, Tokyo
Foreign relations of Japan
Japanese community of London
Japanese School in London
Japan–United Kingdom relations
Ministry of Foreign Affairs (Japan)

References

External links

 

London
Japan
Japan–United Kingdom relations
Grade II listed buildings in the City of Westminster
St James's